Edward Austin Sheldon (October 4, 1823 – August 26, 1897) was an American educator, and the founding president of State University of New York at Oswego (then Oswego Primary Teachers' Training School). He also served as superintendent of schools for the cities of Syracuse, New York and Oswego, New York. Sheldon's main achievement was the introduction of the principles and teachings of Johann Heinrich Pestalozzi into American education through the Oswego Movement. His daughter was educator Mary Sheldon Barnes.

References

External links
 New Studies in Education: The Oswego Movement in American Education, by Ned H. Dearborn, 1925
 Oswego: Fountainhead of Teacher Education; A Century in the Sheldon Tradition, Dorothy Rogers,  1961
 The Autobiography of Edward Austin Sheldon, ed. Mary Sheldon Barnes, 1911

Hamilton College (New York) alumni
Presidents of campuses of the State University of New York
1823 births
1897 deaths
People from Oswego, New York
People from Perry, New York